The 1898 Minnesota gubernatorial election took place on November 8, 1898. Democratic Party of Minnesota candidate John Lind defeated Republican Party of Minnesota challenger William Henry Eustis. This is the second of three successive elections in which John Lind ran as a candidate for a coalition formed from the Democrats and the People's Party.

Results

See also
 List of Minnesota gubernatorial elections

External links
 http://www.sos.state.mn.us/home/index.asp?page=653
 http://www.sos.state.mn.us/home/index.asp?page=657

Minnesota
Gubernatorial
1898
November 1898 events